Mohamed Shokry (born 6 July 1999) is an Egyptian professional footballer who plays as a left-back for Ceramica Cleopatra. He is a product of Al Ahly youth academy.

Career statistics

Club

Notes

References

1999 births
Living people
People from Sharqia Governorate
Egyptian footballers
Association football defenders
Egyptian Premier League players
Al Ahly SC players
Smouha SC players